Marine Sciences Research Center is a research center at Stony Brook University. The center studies coastal oceanographic processes and atmospheric sciences.

In 1997 the center was awarded grants of $7.1 million, including more than $1.9 million from the National Science Foundation alone.

References

External links 

 Marine Sciences Research Center – Official website
 MSRC page at the School of Marine and Atmospheric Sciences  – School of Marine and Atmospheric Sciences website
 State University of New York at Stony Brook – Official website

Stony Brook University
Brookhaven, New York